Andreas Hilfiker (born 11 February 1969) is a Swiss former international footballer who played as a goalkeeper.

Playing career 
Born in Aarau, Hilfiker joined FC Aarau in 1986, playing nearly 200 league games for the first team in over 10 years, winning the Swiss national title in 1992–93, before moving to Germany, where he signed for 1. FC Nürnberg. At this time, in the late 1990s, he made eight appearances for the Switzerland national football team. Hilfiker later played for Tennis Borussia Berlin and SSV Ulm 1846 before signing for FC Vaduz in Liechtenstein. He also played for FC Luzern and Zug 94 in his native Switzerland.

Coaching career 
At the end of his playing career, Hilfiker became the goalkeeping coach of FC Thun. After a period in the same role at his home-team club FC Aarau, he became the goalkeeping coach of VfL Wolfsburg in 2008. In 2018, he became responsible for coordinating the goalkeeping department at Wolfsburg. After almost 12 years at the club, Wolfsburg confirmed on 23 December 2019 that they had parted ways with Hilfiker by mutual agreement.

References

External links 
 
 Andreas Hilfiker biography 

1969 births
Living people
People from Aarau
Swiss men's footballers
Switzerland international footballers
Association football goalkeepers
Swiss Super League players
Bundesliga players
2. Bundesliga players
FC Aarau players
1. FC Nürnberg players
Tennis Borussia Berlin players
SSV Ulm 1846 players
FC Vaduz players
Swiss expatriate sportspeople in Liechtenstein
FC Luzern players
Swiss expatriate footballers
Expatriate footballers in Germany
Expatriate footballers in Liechtenstein
Sportspeople from Aargau